This article is a list of Catholic newspapers and magazines in the United States.

For the frequency listings, the terminology will be as follows
 Bimonthly: every two months, not two per month
 Biweekly: every two weeks, not two per week.

By state and diocese or eparchy 
The following is a list containing the official newspaper, newsletter, magazine or other publication of the dioceses of the United States, organized alphabetically by state followed by diocese:

Non-diocesan newspapers and magazines

References 

Catholic
 
Newspapers and magazines